The Cut (also known as Cadaver, literally Anatomy classroom) is a 2007 South Korean film.

Plot 
Seon-hwa is a new student at an elite medical school, and she is initiated into a dissection class headed by Dr. Han along with five other students, including her boyfriend Ki-beom. After the first class the students all start to share the same nightmare involving a one-eyed surgeon, and one by one they start to be murdered, the victims being discovered with their hearts removed. Seon-hwa and Ki-beom are convinced that these events are related to a beautiful cadaver with a rose tattoo on her breast, and they begin an investigation to uncover her identity.

Cast
 Han Ji-min as Seon-hwa
 On Joo-wan as Joong-suk
 Oh Tae-kyung as Ki-beom
 Jo Min-ki as Dr. Han
 Moon Won-joo as Kyung-min
 Soy
 Chae Yun-seo
 Jin Yu-young
 Park Chan-hwan (cameo)
 Jung Chan (cameo)
 Xiyeon (Pristin) as young Seonhwa

Release 
The Cut was released in South Korea on 11 July 2007, and on its opening weekend was ranked third at the box office with 264,765 admissions. The film went on to receive a total of 622,400 admissions nationwide, with a gross (as of 5 August 2007) of $3,898,774.

References

External links 
 
 
 

2000s Korean-language films
2007 horror films
South Korean horror films
2007 films
2000s South Korean films